Missing Daughters is a 1939 American crime film directed by Charles C. Coleman. It stars Richard Arlen, Rochelle Hudson, and Marian Marsh.

Plot
Kay Roberts comes to see radio crime commentator Wally King after the death of Josie, her sister and wife. Josie left home to become a nightclub hostess, only to fall victim to a series of murders covering up a slavery racket.

Wally goes undercover to investigate with the police department's consent after disparaging their work on his radio program. Kay also takes a job as a cigarette girl, hoping to help Wally with his work. The nightclub's owner figures out what Wally is up to and is about to kill him when Capt. McGraw of the police intervenes, just in time.

Cast

 Richard Arlen as Wally
 Rochelle Hudson as Kay
 Marian Marsh as Josie Lamonte
 Isabel Jewell as Peggy
 Edward Raquello as Lucky Rogers
 Dick Wessel as 	Brick McGirk
 Eddie Kane as Nick
 Wade Boteler as Capt. McGraw
 Don Beddoe as Al Farrow
 Claire Rochelle as Doris
 Byron Foulger as 	Bert Ford 
 John Harmon as	Tim 
 Allen Vincent as 	Slinky
 Walter Sande as 	Snoop 
 Esther Howard as 	Mother Hawks 
 Cy Schindell as Mugg 
 Lucile Browne as 	Estelle
 Lorna Gray as 	Nan 
 Dorothy Short as 	Bee
 Christine McIntyre as 	Ruth
 Mary Ainslee as 	Showgirl
 Dorothy Fay as Showgirl
 Mildred Shay as 	Hostess
 James Craig as 	1st Attendant 
 Richard Fiske as 	2nd Attendant
 Rosina Galli as	Italian

References

External links

1939 films
American crime action films
American crime drama films
American action drama films
1930s crime action films
1930s crime drama films
1930s action drama films
Films directed by Charles C. Coleman
American black-and-white films
Columbia Pictures films
1930s American films